GeoSciML or Geoscience Markup Language is a GML Application Schema that can be used to transfer information about geology, with an emphasis on the "interpreted geology" that is conventionally portrayed on geologic maps. Its feature-type catalogue includes Geologic Unit, Mapped Feature, Earth Material, Geologic Structure, and specializations of these, as well as Borehole and other observational artefacts. It was created by, and is governed by, the Commission for the Management and Application of Geoscience Information (CGI) to support interoperability of information served from Geologic Surveys and other data custodians. It will be used in the OneGeology project, an effort to create a geological map of the entire Earth, served live by merging data from many national geological surveys.

The GeoSciML project was initiated in 2003, under the auspices of the Commission for Geoscience Information (CGI) working group on Data Model Collaboration. The project is part of what is known as the CGI Interoperability
Working Group.

GeoSciML is intended for use by data portals publishing data for customers in GeoSciML, for interchanging data between organisations that use different database implementations and software/systems environments, and in particular, for use in geoscience web services. In this way, GeoSciML allows applications to utilize globally distributed geoscience data and information.

Version 3.1 was released in December, 2012. In January, 2013 a Standards Working Group was initiated in the Open Geospatial Consortium to develop a version 4 release as an OGC modular specification. This release will include simple feature 'portrayal' schemes to support interoperable view services. Links to documentation, XML schema and other resources are available at the GeoSciML resource repository.

See also

 Systems Geology
 OneGeology

External links
 Geoscience Markup Language (GeoSciML) - from IUGS Commission for Geoscience Information
 XML schemas and documentation from the official release server.
 Geologic Time Scale  - model and schema as described in a paper published in Geosphere
 Developing the GeoSciML interoperability standard, Geoscience Australia and CSIRO, November 2007
 , GeoSciML- A GML Application for Geoscience Information Interchange, USGS OFR 2007-1285
 , GeoSciML Version 3 Release announcement, American Geophysical Union, 2011.

XML markup languages
Geology software
Industry-specific XML-based standards
GIS file formats